The Tooloom National Park is a protected national park located in the Northern Rivers region of New South Wales, Australia.

The park is part of the Focal Peak Group World Heritage Site Gondwana Rainforests of Australia inscribed in 1986 and added to the Australian National Heritage List in 2007.

The name Tooloom is derived from Bundjalung word Duluhm meaning headlice, referring to the Tooloom Falls.

The average summer temperature in the park ranges from 16 °C and 28 °C, and the winter temperature ranges from 3.5 °C and 18 °C.

Fauna 
The endangered species of long-nosed potoroo lives in the park, and there are also ten species of wallabies and kangaroos.

Gallery

See also
 Protected areas of New South Wales

References

External links
 Tooloom National Park

National parks of New South Wales
Protected areas established in 1995
Gondwana Rainforests of Australia
1995 establishments in Australia
Northern Rivers